This is a list of films produced and released by American film studio Searchlight Pictures since 2020.

All films listed are theatrical releases unless specified. Films labeled with a  symbol signify a streaming release exclusively through Hulu, Disney+ or the Star content hub/Star+.

2020s

Upcoming films

Undated films

References

External links 
 

 
Disney-related lists
Searchlight Pictures
Lists of films released by Disney
American films by studio